The Ramat Yotam Caldera is a Proterozoic volcano located about  west of Eilat in southernmost Israel. It formed 548 million years ago at the southern end of the Ramat Yotam graben.

References

External links

Volcanoes of Israel
Proterozoic calderas